is a Japanese American jazz pianist. In particular, he is known for his work with the Airto Moreira/Flora Purim group and in Miles Davis's band in the late 1980s and early 1990s.

He was born in Japan, but lived in Cleveland, Ohio, for part of his childhood, until he moved back to Japan at the age of 12. He later returned to the United States at 22. He is associated with the Californian jazz scene at present. He is the Chancellor Professor of Music at the University of California, Irvine.

Discography

As leader/co-leader

As sideman 
With Miles Davis
 Dingo with Michel Legrand (Warner Bros., 1991) – soundtrack
 Miles in Paris (Warner Bros., 1991) – live recorded in 1989
 Live Around the World (Warner Bros., 1996) – live recorded in 1988–91

With Frank Gambale
 Brave New Guitar (Legato, 1985)
 A Present for the Future (Legato, 1987)
 Live! (Legato, 1989) – live recorded in 1988
 Thunder From Down Under (Victor, 1990) – recorded in 1989
 Note Worker (Victor, 1991)

With Allan Holdsworth
 Frankfurt '86 (Live, 2020)[CD & DVD-Video]

With Al di Meola
 Tirami Su (Manhattan, 1987)
 Live at Montreal International Jazz Festival 88 (Vap, 2002)[DVD-Video] – live recorded in 1988 at Montreal International Jazz Festival

With James Newton
 Suite for Frida Kahlo (AudioQuest Music, 1994)

References

External links
Official Website (Japanese)
Billboard bio
Faculty bio UCI
Allmusic

1953 births
Living people
American jazz pianists
American male pianists
Japanese jazz pianists
American musicians of Japanese descent
Miles Davis
Japanese emigrants to the United States
American academics of Japanese descent
University of California, Irvine faculty
Musicians from Aomori Prefecture
International Christian University alumni
20th-century American pianists
American male jazz musicians
African-American pianists